Idol is a surname. Notable people with the surname include:

 Austin Idol (born 1949), American wrestler, born Michael McCord
 Billy Idol (born 1955), American pop singer, born Michael Broad
 John D. Idol (born 1958/1959), American businessman
 Ryan Idol (born 1964), American pornographic film actor, born Marc Donais